The 2011 NCAA Women's Division I Swimming and Diving Championships were contested at the 30th annual NCAA-sanctioned swim meet to determine the team and individual national champions of Division I women's collegiate swimming and diving in the United States. 

This year's events were hosted by the University of Texas at the Lee and Joe Jamail Texas Swimming Center in Austin, Texas. 

California captured this year's team title, finishing 29.5 points ahead of Georgia. It was the Golden Bears' second team title and second title in three seasons.

Team standings
Note: Top 10 only
(H) = Hosts
(DC) = Defending champions
Full results

See also
List of college swimming and diving teams

References

NCAA Division I Swimming And Diving Championships
NCAA Division I Swimming And Diving Championships
NCAA Division I Women's Swimming and Diving Championships